Antanas Vaupšas (20 May 1936 – 14 December 2017) was a Lithuanian athlete. He competed in the men's long jump at the 1964 Summer Olympics, representing the Soviet Union, finishing in 14th place with a jump of 7.43 meters.

References

1936 births
2017 deaths
Athletes (track and field) at the 1964 Summer Olympics
Lithuanian male long jumpers
Lithuanian male high jumpers
Soviet male long jumpers
Soviet male high jumpers
Olympic athletes of the Soviet Union